James Ritchie may refer to:

 James Ritchie (rugby union) (1907–1942), Scottish international rugby union player
 James Ritchie (naturalist) (1882–1958), President of the Royal Society of Edinburgh
 James Ritchie (Massachusetts politician) (1815–1873), American teacher and politician
 James Dale Ritchie (1976–2016), American serial killer
 James Ewing Ritchie (1820–1898), English journalist and writer
 James M. Ritchie (1829–1918), U.S. Representative from Ohio 
 James Martin Ritchie (1917–1993), chairman of Bowater's
 Jim Ritchie (James McLaren Ritchie, 1907–1981), New Zealand businessman 
 James H. Ritchie Jr. (born 1961), member of the South Carolina Senate
 Sir James Ritchie, 1st Baronet (1835–1912), Lord Mayor of London
 James Ritchie & Son, Scottish clockmakers